The Saint John's Johnnies football program represents Saint John's University in Collegeville, Minnesota.  They compete at the NCAA Division III level and are members of the (MIAC) Minnesota Intercollegiate Athletic Conference. From 1953 through November 19, 2012, collegiate hall-of-fame coach John Gagliardi coached the Johnnies, posting a 489–138–11 record over 59 years. Gagliardi's 489 wins are the most all-time for any football coach across all divisions. The current coach is Gary Fasching, who was named to the position on December 28, 2012.

The Johnnies are the winningest football program in Division III history, boasting a 664-252-24 record following the 2021 season.

Players drafted into the NFL

References

External links
 

 
American football teams established in 1900
1900 establishments in Minnesota